Pornucopia is an American documentary series by HBO spin off from Real Sex that focuses on the Californian porn industry. It featured interviews with Jenna Jameson, Jenna Haze, Katie Morgan, Dave Cummings, Evan Stone, Jeff Stryker, Stormy Daniels, Annabelle Travello and many more.

Episode list

References

External links
 "HBO: The Best of Pornucopia" HBO documentaries, official page
 

2000s American documentary television series
2004 American television series debuts
2004 American television series endings
HBO original programming
English-language television shows